Sedum cespitosa is a species of annual herb in the family Crassulaceae. It has a self-supporting growth form and simple, broad leaves. Individuals can grow to 3 cm.

References 

cespitosa
Flora of Malta
Crassulaceae